Nitin Paranjpe (born 1963) is the present Chief Transformation Officer & Chief People Officer of Unilever, a position that he took over in Jan 2022. Prior to this he was the President of Unilever's Food and Refreshment business, a role he was appointed in 2018. Before this, he headed the Home Care business from 1 October 2013. Paranjpe was also the CEO of the Unilever's Indian business - Hindustan Unilever - and Executive Vice President for the South Asia region encompassing Unilever's businesses in India, Pakistan, Bangladesh, Sri Lanka and Nepal from 2008-2013.

Early life
Paranjpe obtained a degree in BE (Mechanical Engineering) from College of Engineering, Pune and an MBA in Marketing from Jamnalal Bajaj Institute of Management Studies, Mumbai.

Career
Nitin Paranjpe joined the Indian subsidiary of Unilever, named Hindustan Lever Limited at the time as a management trainee in 1987. In his early years he performed different roles across marketing and customer development. Subsequently, he moved to London to work as Executive Assistant to the Chair and Unilever Executive Committee and then returned to lead the Laundry and Household Care categories in India before joining the management committee of the Indian business in 2006 as head of the Home and Personal Care business. Paranjpe became the CEO of the Indian business and Executive Vice President for the South Asia region in 2008, a role he performed until October 2013, when he became the President of Unilever's Home Care business. After serving in this position for 5 years, he became the President of food and refreshments and member of the Unilever Leadership Executive on 1 January 2018. He is currently Unilever’s Chief Operating Officer, a role he was appointed in May 2019.

Paranjpe is also a member of the Unilever Leadership Executive.

Paranjpe was the youngest CEO in the history of Hindustan Unilever and was credited as a man who turned around the fortunes of the business in a tough macro-economic environment.

References

External links
 
 Nitin Paranjpe at Hindustan Unilever
 Nitin Paranjpe at Business Week
 Nitin Paranjpe at Forbes India

Indian chief executives
Living people
1963 births